SD Tempest is an ART 8032 class tug operated by Serco Marine Services in support of the United Kingdom's Naval Service. Tempest was ordered specifically to handle the Queen Elizabeth Class aircraft carriers however she performs general harbour towage when not required in her primary role.

Normally based in Portsmouth, Tempest was temporarily transferred to Rosyth in June 2017 to assist with HMS Queen Elizabeth's departure on sea trials.

See also
Naval Service (United Kingdom)
List of ships of Serco Marine Services

References

Serco Marine Services (ships)
Tugboats of the United Kingdom
2016 ships